Anne Elisabet Kulle, née Nord (14 January 1944 in Solna – 25 January 2020) was a Swedish actress. She was married to actor Jarl Kulle from 1976 until his death in 1997.

Filmography
1962 – Åsa-Nisse på Mallorca
1968 – ...som havets nakna vind
1970 – Ministern
1976 – Polare
1977 – Eva & Kristina
2011 – Tjuvarnas jul (TV-series)

References

1944 births
2020 deaths
Swedish actresses